Guangzhou Railway Museum is a railway museum in Liwan District, Guangzhou, Guangdong Province, China.

History 
The museum is situated on the site of a former railway station, Huangsha, which opened in July 1907. On 18 December 1946, passenger services stopped using the station and it was renamed Guangzhou South. It closed completely on 10 June 2005.

The museum opened on 18 May 2022, International Museum Day.

Items 
The museum has an indoor area of approximately 18,500 square metres and an outdoor area of approximately 10,500 square metres.

 China Railways JS steam locomotive
 China Railways DF4D diesel-electric locomotive
 China Railways SS6B  electric locomotive
 China Railways type 22 coaches (hard seat cars)
 China Railways 25G rolling stock (dining car)
 China Railways P1 Boxcar
 China Railway DJJ1 power car (had been taken down)
 China Railways 25C rolling stock (class 2 soft seat car, had been taken down)

References 

Museums in Guangzhou
Railway museums in China
2022 establishments in China